Petronilla Bembo (fl. 1463), was a Duchess consort of Naxos by marriage to Francesco II Crispo. 

She served as regent of Naxos during the minority of her son Giacomo III Crispo (r. 1463-1480). 

 Issue
 Giacomo III Crispo 
 Giovanni III Crispo

References
 Miller, William. The Latins in the Levant: A History of Frankish Greece (1204–1566). London: 1908.

15th-century women rulers
Women of the Crusader states
People from the Duchy of the Archipelago
Year of birth unknown